LNER Thompson Class B1 61306 is a preserved British steam locomotive. In preservation, it has carried the LNER-derived number 1306 and the name Mayflower, complete with LNER Apple Green Livery, though this guise is entirely fictional as the engine was BR built. 61306 now runs wearing BR Apple Green with British Railways lettering.

Service 
61306 was built in 1948 by the North British Locomotive Company, Works No. 26207. Though built to an LNER design, it was delivered after nationalisation to British Railways (BR).  

61306 was initially allocated to Hull Botanic Gardens Depot (shed code 53B). In June 1959 it was transferred to nearby Hull Dairycoates Depot (53A). Its final allocation in June 1967 was to Bradford Low Moor depot (56F), but it was quickly withdrawn in September 1967.

Preservation 
61306 was privately purchased for preservation at Steamtown Carnforth, one of just two preserved Thompson B1s, the other being LNER-built No. (6)1264.

At Steamtown it was painted into LNER Apple Green Livery, given the number 1306 and the name Mayflower.  1306 would have been its allocated running number had the LNER not been nationalised (most ex-LNER BR numbers being the LNER 1946 numbers with the addition of 60000), while the name Mayflower came from a scrapped BR-built Thompson B1, numbered 61379.

In 1978, it moved to the Great Central Railway in Leicestershire, where it remained until 1989 when it was taken out of service for a ten-year overhaul. Scheduled to return to Hull Dairycoates, the sale of the site meant that it moved to the Nene Valley Railway.

Sold privately in 2006 to the Boden family, it moved to their company, Boden Rail Engineering Ltd, in Washwood Heath, Birmingham. In 2013, it returned to steam wearing its original BR Apple Green livery and 61306, operated by West Coast Railways from their base at the former Steamtown Carnforth.

In 2014, 61306 was sold by the Boden family to David Buck and moved to the North Norfolk Railway. It was prepared there for full mainline running, operating the Cathedrals Express from Norwich to Windsor, its first mainline operating since the mid-1970s.

In February 2019 for its first revenue earning run after emerging from an overhaul and testing at Carnforth 61306 double headed with SR Merchant Navy no 35018 British India Line while hauling The Railway Touring Company's "Winter Cumbrian Mountain Express" that ran from London Euston to Carlisle on Sat 2 Feb. The two engines, with 61306 acting as pilot to 35018, took over the train from 86259 at Carnforth for the run to Carlisle via Shap. The return leg took the two engines south down the Settle and Carlisle, Ribble Valley & East Lancashire Lines to Preston where 86259 took over.

During Summer 2019, it operated three regular, one-way, Tuesdays only, services from Waterloo to Windsor and Eton Riverside, being the first regular steam-operated service from that London terminus for 52 years, alongside a steam excursion on the same day.

In June 2022 the engine was acquired from David Buck by Jeremy Hosking owned "Locomotive Services Group". The engine alongside operating the Steam Dreams programme of railtours will also become part of the LSL pool of engines.

References

External links 

 1306 Mayflower Group

4-6-0 locomotives
NBL locomotives
Preserved London and North Eastern Railway steam locomotives
Railway locomotives introduced in 1948